A washer is a thin plate (typically disk-shaped, but sometimes square) with a hole (typically in the middle) that is normally used to distribute the load of a threaded fastener, such as a bolt or nut. Other uses are as a spacer, spring (Belleville washer, wave washer), wear pad, preload indicating device, locking device, and to reduce vibration (rubber washer).

Washers are usually metal or plastic. High-quality bolted joints require hardened steel washers to prevent the loss of pre-load due to brinelling after the torque is applied. Washers are also important for preventing galvanic corrosion, particularly by insulating steel screws from aluminium surfaces. They may also be used in rotating applications, as a bearing. A thrust washer is used when a rolling element bearing is not needed either from a cost-performance perspective or due to space restraints. Coatings can be used to reduce wear and friction, either by hardening the surface or by providing a solid lubricant (i.e. a self-lubricating surface).

The origin of the word is unknown; the first recorded use of the word was in 1346, however, the first time its definition was recorded was in 1611.

Rubber or fiber gaskets used in taps (or faucets, or valves) as seal against water leaks are sometimes referred to colloquially as washers; but, while they may look similar, washers and gaskets are usually designed for different functions and made differently.

Washer types
Most washers can be categorized into three broad types; 
 Plain washers, which spread a load, and prevent damage to the surface being fixed, or provide some sort of insulation such as electrical
 Spring washers, which have axial flexibility and are used to prevent fastening or loosening due to vibrations
 Locking washers, which prevent fastening or loosening by preventing unscrewing rotation of the fastening device; locking washers are usually also spring washers.

Plain washers

Spring and locking washers

 

Lock washers, locknuts, jam nuts, and thread-locking fluid are ways to prevent vibration from loosening a bolted joint.

Gaskets
The term washer is often applied to various gasket types such as those used to seal the control valve in taps.

Specialised types

The DIN 125 metric washer standard refers to subtypes A and B.  ISO 7089 calls these Form A and ISO 7090 calls them Form B.  They are all the same overall size, but Form B is chamfered on one side.

Materials
Washers can be fabricated from a variety of materials including, but not limited to:
 Steel – Carbon steel, spring steel, A2 (304) stainless steel, and A4 (316/316L) stainless steel
 Non-ferrous metal – Copper, brass, aluminium, titanium, iron, bronze, and zinc
 Alloy – Silicon bronze, Inconel, Monel, and Hastelloy
 Plastic – Thermoplastics and thermosetting polymers such as polyethylene, PTFE (Teflon)
 Nylon – Nylon 6, Nylon 66, Nylatron, and Tecamid MDS
 Specialty – Fibers, ceramics, rubber, felt, leather, bimetals, and mica
Phenolic – The material  has good electrical insulation, is lightweight, tough, has low moisture absorption, is heat resistant, and is resistant to chemicals and corrosion. Phenolic washers are substitutes for flat metallic washers in cases where electrical insulation is required. Phenolic washers are stamped out of large sheets of the phenolic material. The term “phenolic washer” is sometimes used for stamped washers from laminated materials such as paper, canvas, and Mylar.

Corrosion resistance 
A number of techniques are used to enhance the corrosion resistant properties of certain washer materials:
 Metallic coatings – Typical coatings used to produce corrosion resistant washers are zinc, cadmium, and nickel. Zinc coating acts as a sacrificial surface layer that falls victim to corrosive materials before the washer's material can be harmed. Cadmium produces a high-quality protective surface but is toxic, both biologically and environmentally. Nickel coatings add protection from corrosion only when the finish is dense and non-porous.
 Electroplating – This method involves coating the washer by electrolytic deposition using metals such as chromium or silver.
 Phosphating – A resilient, but abrasive surface is achieved by incorporating a zinc-phosphate layer and corrosion-protective oil. 
 Browning or bluing – Exposing the washer (typically steel) to a chemical compound or alkali salt solution causes an oxidizing chemical reaction, which results in the creation of a corrosion-resistant, colored surface. The integrity of the coating can be improved by treating the finished product with a water-displacing oil.
 Chemical plating – This technique utilizes a nickel-phosphor alloy that is precipitated onto the washer surface, creating an extremely corrosion- and abrasive-resistant surface.

Type and form

 
The American National Standards Institute (ANSI) provides standards for general use flat washers. Type A is a series of steel washers at broad tolerances, where precision is not critical. Type B is a series of flat washers with tighter tolerances where outside diameters are categorized as "narrow", "regular" or "wide" for specific bolt sizes.

"Type" is not to be confused with "form" (but often is). The British Standard for Metric Series Metal Washers (BS4320), written in 1968, coined the term "form". The forms go from A to G and dictate the outside diameter and thickness of the flat washers.
 Form A: Normal diameter, normal thickness
 Form B: Normal diameter, light thickness
 Form C: Large diameter, normal thickness
 Form D: Large diameter, light thickness
 Form E: Normal diameter, normal thickness
 Form F: Large diameter, normal thickness
 Form G: Largest diameter, larger thickness. Washer 'form' when comparing different washer material types is used quite freely by stockists.  In relation to BS4320 specifically, washer forms 'A' to 'D' inclusive are designated ‘bright metal’ washers and are supplied self-finished in various metals including: steel alloys, brass, copper, etc.  Whereas, BS4320 washer forms ‘E’ to ‘G’ inclusive are designated ‘black’ (uncoated) mild steel washers, which normally are specified with a supplementary protective coating supply condition.

Standard metric flat washers sizes 
Washers of standard metric sizes equivalent to BS4320 Form A are listed in the table below. Measurements in the table refer to the dimensions of the washers as described by the drawing. Specifications for standard metric flat washers were known as DIN 125 (withdrawn) and replaced with ISO 7089. DIN (Deutsches Institut für Normung - German Institute for Standardization) standards are issued for a variety of components including industrial fasteners as Metric DIN 125 Flat Washers. The DIN standards remain common in Germany, Europe and globally even though the transition to ISO standards is taking place. DIN standards continue to be used for parts which do not have ISO equivalents or for which there is no need for standardization.

See also
 Bit guard
 Dowel
 Unified Thread Standard

Notes

References

Further reading
 Parmley, Robert. (2000). "Section 11: Washers." Illustrated Sourcebook of Mechanical Components. New York: McGraw Hill.  Drawings, designs and discussion of various uses of washers.

External links

(http://www.fastenerdata.co.uk/flat-washers Dimensions of Global washers
 ASME Plain washer dimensions (Type A and Type B)
 Typical USA Flat Washer Dimensions USS, SAE, Fender, and NAS washer ID & OD (mm)
 American National Standard (ANSI) Type B Plain Washers
 SAE Flat Washers Type A Plain Washers
 USS & SAE Combined Flat Washer Dimensions
 Flat Washer Thickness Table Steel Gage Thicknesses, non-metric
 Split Lockwashers:  Truth vs. Myth Hill Country Engineering
Using machine washers Machine Design - Using washers

Hardware (mechanical)
Springs (mechanical)
Ironmongery